Articles on electronic software licensing include:

 Software license
 Software license agreement
 Shrink wrap contract
 Clickwrap